Brayden Jaw (born April 24, 1992) is a Canadian-born Chinese ice hockey player. After playing NCAA Division I Ice Hockey at Harvard University, he signed with the Kunlun Red Stars of the Kontinental Hockey League (KHL).

Playing career
Brayden Jaw played with the Greater Vancouver Canadians in the BCMML league in 2007-08; the Surrey Eagles (BCHL) in 2008-10; the Nanaimo Clippers (BCHL) from 2009-2011; and the Surrey Eagles (BCHL) in 2011-2012. In 2012, he went on to play NCAA Division I Men’s Ice Hockey for the Harvard Crimsons. During his time at Harvard, his team won the ECAC Hockey championship in the 2014-2015 season.

Following his collegiate career, Jaw went on to play hockey where he signed in 2017 with the Beijing Kunlun Red Stars until 2019.

International play
Jaw was part of the Chinese hockey development team for the 2022 Winter Olympics in Beijing but did not get selected to compete.

Personal life
Jaw attended St. George's School in Vancouver, British Columbia and went on to get a Bachelor of Arts at Harvard University with a concentration in economics and a secondary concentration in psychology

References

External links

1992 births
Living people
Canadian ice hockey defencemen
Canadian ice hockey forwards
Canadian sportspeople of Chinese descent
Harvard Crimson men's ice hockey players
Harvard University alumni
HC Kunlun Red Star players
Massachusetts Institute of Technology
MIT Sloan School of Management alumni
Nanaimo Clippers players
Orlando Solar Bears (ECHL) players
St. George's School (Vancouver) alumni
Surrey Eagles players